The Banque de Tunisie is a bank in Tunisia, the first established in the country in modern times. It has been listed in the Bourse de Tunis since 1990.

History

Its seat was a diminutive building at 3, rue Es-Sadikia (now rue Gamal Abdel Nasser), across the street from the French protectorate residence, which has since been demolished. Its founders hoped to secure the exclusive right to issue banknotes in the protectorate from the French government, which however was eventually granted to the Banque de l'Algérie in 1904. 

In 1911, the Banque de Tunisie participated alongside the Banque Transatlantique in the creation of the Banque Commerciale du Maroc, headquartered in Paris and with main office in Casablanca. In 1941, it was acquired together with Banque Transatlantique by the Crédit Industriel et Commercial (CIC), which took advantage of the Vichy anti-Jewish legislation.

By the time of Tunisian independence in 1956, the CIC agreed to cede most of its 70% equity stake in Banque de Tunisie to the country's government; at that time, most of the bank's staff were Jewish, as were about a third of its depositors. In 1963, the Banque de Tunisie took over the branches of Société Générale in Tunis and Sfax, in exchange for a 17.5% stake. Other European and American banks subsequently acquired minority stakes in the Banque de Tunisie. In 1968, it acquired the former Tunisian operation of France's Compagnie Algérienne. In 1977, Tunisian shareholders regained a majority in the bank's capital. By the late 2000s, Tunisian shareholders together owned around three-quarters of the bank's equity capital, and Crédit Mutuel (which had taken over the CIC in 1998) owned 20%. At that time, the bank had the largest market capitalization of all listed Tunisian companies. Belhassen Trabelsi, the brother of Leïla Ben Ali, wife of President Zine El Abidine Ben Ali, was one of the bank's board members. In late 2012, Crédit Mutuel increased its stake to 33% by acquiring the shares formerly owned by the Trabelsi family.

See also

 List of banks in Tunisia
 Compagnie Algérienne

Notes

External links 
 

Banks established in 1884
Banks of Tunisia
Organisations based in Tunis
Economy of Tunis
1880s establishments in Tunisia
1884 establishments in Africa
Companies listed on the Bourse de Tunis
Crédit Mutuel